"Run, Rabbit, Run" is a song written by Noel Gay and Ralph Butler. The music was by Noel Gay and the song was originally sung by Flanagan and Allen accompanied by the Harry Bidgood orchestra.

Background
This song was written for Noel Gay's show The Little Dog Laughed, which opened on 11 October 1939, at a time when most of the major London theatres were closed. It was a popular song during World War II, especially after Flanagan and Allen changed the lyrics to poke fun at the Germans (e.g. Run, Adolf, run, Adolf, run, run, Run........)

The lyrics were used as a defiant dig at the allegedly ineffectual Luftwaffe. On 13  November 1939, soon after the outbreak of the Second World War and also soon after the song was premiered, Germany launched its first air raid on Britain, on flying boats that were sheltering in Sullom Voe, Shetland. Two rabbits were supposedly killed by a bomb drop, although it is suggested that they were in fact procured from a butchers' shop and used for publicity purposes.

Walter H. Thompson's TV biography I Was Churchill's Bodyguard rates the song as Winston Churchill's favourite as Prime Minister. Jock Colville, Churchill's private secretary during much of the war, mentions the Prime Minister singing part of the song.

In popular culture
 In a 1992 advert for Weetabix, the song is sung by Elmer Fudd as he chases Bugs Bunny.
 In the 2003 movie, House of 1000 Corpses, one of the villains sings this song.
 In 2004, the song was used in an advertisement for Tourism Victoria (Australia), which depicted the Yarra Valley.
 The 2014 television series opener of “Outlander” used the song.
 The book series and 2016 film Miss Peregrine's Home for Peculiar Children uses this song on a number of occasions.
 The 2017 horror film Get Out, written and directed by Jordan Peele, uses the original version in the opening scene and once again near the end.

References

1939 songs
Songs from musicals
Songs with music by Noel Gay
Songs with lyrics by Ralph Butler
Flanagan and Allen songs
Songs about rabbits and hares
Songs about hunters